Zsombor Berecz (born 13 December 1995) is a Hungarian football player who plays for Vasas. He was also part of the Hungarian U-20 team at the 2015 FIFA U-20 World Cup.

International career
In November 2016 Berecz received his first call-up to the senior Hungary squad for matches against Andorra and Sweden.

Club statistics

Updated to games played as of 15 January 2021.

References

External links
 
 

1995 births
Sportspeople from Miskolc
Living people
Hungarian footballers
Hungary youth international footballers
Hungary under-21 international footballers
Hungary international footballers
Association football midfielders
Vasas SC players
Fehérvár FC players
Mezőkövesdi SE footballers
Nemzeti Bajnokság I players
Nemzeti Bajnokság II players
21st-century Hungarian people